Yevgeny Kafelnikov and Andriy Medvedev were the defending champions, but they finished last in their group and were thus eliminated.
Fabrice Santoro and Todd Woodbridge won this event, defeating Arnaud Boetsch and Cédric Pioline 6–2, 6–4 in the final.

Draw

Final

Group A
Standings are determined by: 1. number of wins; 2. number of matches; 3. in three-players-ties, percentage of sets won, or of games won; 4. steering-committee decision.

Group B
Standings are determined by: 1. number of wins; 2. number of matches; 3. in three-players-ties, percentage of sets won, or of games won; 4. steering-committee decision.

References
Completed matches (Legends Under 45 Doubles), accessed 2011-06-05.

Legends Under 45 Doubles